The 2012 Buffalo Bulls football team represented the University at Buffalo in the 2012 NCAA Division I FBS football season. They were led by third-year head coach Jeff Quinn and played their home games at University at Buffalo Stadium. They were a member of the East Division of the Mid-American Conference. They finished the season 4–8, 3–5 in MAC play to finish in a tie for fourth place in the East Division.

Schedule

Source: Schedule

Game summaries

@ Georgia

Morgan State

Kent State

@ Connecticut

@ Ohio

@ Northern Illinois

Pittsburgh

Toledo

Miami (OH)

Western Michigan

@ Massachusetts

vs Bowling Green

References

Buffalo
Buffalo Bulls football seasons
Buffalo Bulls football